St Albans Hockey Club is a field hockey club that is based at Oaklands College in Hatfield Road, St Albans, Hertfordshire. The club was founded in 1898.

The club runs twelve men's teams  with the first XI playing in the Men's England Hockey League Midlands Conference  and eight women's teams  with the first XI playing in the Women's England Hockey League Midlands Conference. 

Former players at the club include two of the team who won gold medals at the Rio 2016 Olympic Games: Ellie Watton, who played for England and Great Britain 2013-18; and Hannah Macleod, who has represented England and Great Britain since 2003. Other former players are John Hurst, who played in goal for England and Great Britain, indoors and out, between 1977 and 1988; and Andy Halliday, the Team Manager of the England / GB Mens Olympic Hockey Team.

References

English field hockey clubs
1898 establishments in England
Sport in Hertfordshire
Sports clubs established in 1898